XHPLA-FM is a radio station in Aguascalientes City, Aguascalientes, Mexico. Broadcasting on 91.3 FM, XHPLA-FM is owned by Radio Universal and carries a regional Mexican format known as La Mexicana.

History
XEPLA-AM 860 received its concession on January 12, 1979. It was originally located in Pabellón de Arteaga.

The station migrated to FM after being authorized to do so in December 2011.

References

Mass media in Aguascalientes City
Radio stations established in 1979
Radio stations in Aguascalientes
Regional Mexican radio stations
Spanish-language radio stations